The Better Public Broadcasting Association (BPBA) is a defunct organization launched in 1995 in Clinton, Oklahoma by a group of local radio broadcasters intended to bring some sense of local ownership to the airwaves and disseminate useful and meaningful information to the public, not only in the event of an emergency but on a day by day and hour by hour basis to their service area.

The Better Public Broadcasting Association, Inc. was incorporated in the state of Oklahoma in 2006 and participated in the Non-commercial educational broadcasting filing window of 2007 as designated by the Federal Communications Commission to start serving small communities with true local radio programming and public service. Following that initial filing window in 2007, BPBA was awarded construction permits for 6 non-commercial educational broadcast facilities; another was purchased in 2009.

The organization de facto dissolved in September 2018, after the Federal Communications Commission inquired about whether the organization's station in Humboldt, Nebraska was still on the air, and the organization admitted it had not aired any programming over any of the stations for several years due to health issues with one of its leaders. At that time, the organization's four licenses were returned to the FCC on September 11th, who cancelled them on September 14th.

Current Operation
BPBA owned the following stations:
  KLXL   91.9  Springfield, Colorado
  KLXO   90.9  Beaver, Oklahoma
  KONZ 105.1 Weatherford, Oklahoma
  KTTE 90.1 Humboldt, Nebraska
These stations generally broadcast classic country music under the branding of "Cat Country".

References 
 KLXL
 KLXO
 KONZ

External links
 BPBA on Facebook

Public broadcasting in the United States
Organizations established in 2006
2006 establishments in Oklahoma
Organizations disestablished in 2018
2018 disestablishments in Oklahoma
Defunct radio broadcasting companies of the United States